The 2015 Skycity Triple Crown was a motor race for V8 Supercars held on the weekend of 19–21 June 2015. It was the fifth round of fourteen in the 2015 International V8 Supercars Championship.

The two sprint races were shared between Holden and Ford; Prodrive Racing Australia driver Chaz Mostert won the opening race by a second ahead of teammate, and championship leader, Mark Winterbottom, while the next three placings were taken by Nissan Motorsport drivers Rick Kelly, James Moffat and Michael Caruso. In race two, Triple Eight Race Engineering's Craig Lowndes led home a Holden 1–2 ahead of Walkinshaw Racing driver Tim Slade, while Mostert completed the podium. With victory, Lowndes became the first V8 Supercar driver to win 100 championship races, spanning 19 years from his maiden win during the 1996 Australian Touring Car Championship season.

The main  race was won by David Reynolds for Rod Nash Racing, having started from pole position. Mostert again finished on the podium, with a second-place finish, while Fabian Coulthard completed the podium for the Brad Jones Racing team. In the championship standings, the top three drivers remained the same; however, Winterbottom extended his championship lead from 12 to 95 ahead of Lowndes, while Coulthard moved closer to Lowndes, trailing by 60 points. Mostert's triple podium finish moved him up to fourth in the standings.

Results

Race 13

Race 14

Race 15

Championship standings
 After Race 15 of 36.

Drivers' Championship standings

Teams' Championship standings

 Note: Only the top five positions are included for both sets of standings.

References

Darwin
June 2015 sports events in Australia
Sport in Darwin, Northern Territory
2010s in the Northern Territory
Motorsport in the Northern Territory